Tawny is often used as a feminine given name; it means the color tawny, a pale orange-brown, or yellow-brown color.

Notable people with the name include:
 Tawny Cypress (born 1976), American actress
 Tawny Little (born 1956), American television newsreader
 Tawny Kitaen (1961–2021), American actress
 Tawny Moyer (born 1957), American actress
 Tawny Newsome (born 1983), American actress
 Tawny Peaks (born 1970), big-bust model, stripper and housewife
 Tawny Taylor, American romance author

See also
Tawney, surname

Feminine given names

fr:Tawny